Gregg Hartsuff is the head coach of the University of Michigan's men's rowing team. He began his University of Michigan coaching career as the novice men's co-coach in the fall of 1992 and took his present position the following year.

Life and work
Hartsuff's hometown is Gregory, Michigan.  He graduated from Stockbridge High School in 1986.

He began his rowing career at Grand Valley State University in 1986, where he rowed for four years. From 1988 to 1990, he co-coached the novice men and women at Grand Valley State. He continued rowing after college and attended a US National Team development camp for lightweight men in 1990.

Hartsuff competed at the United States nationals and won in the intermediate lightweight men's four and eight crews. In 1991, he was a finalist in the men's pair at the United States Pan American Games trials. In 2003 he was the national team's coach for the Men's Heavyweight Single Scull for the World Championships in Milan, Italy, and was also awarded the 2003 Joy of Sculling Coach of the Year award. He continues to row recreationally.

Hartsuff became the University of Michigan's men's rowing team head coach in 1993. He oversaw the Freshman 8 take silver at IRA's in 2002, which is currently the best eights finish by a club team at the varsity national championships. In 2004, he coached the Varsity 4 to the bronze medal at IRA's. Since the formation of the ACRA National Championships, of which Hartsuff is president, Michigan has taken twelve consecutive ACRA Men's Team Point Trophies from 2008 to 2019. In 2008 Hartsuff coached the Men's Varsity 8 at University of Michigan to the Inaugural American Collegiate Rowing Association National Championship, which was the first in string of three consecutive titles. The 2011 ACRA Championships was the first year where Michigan's First Eight did not win, placing second to University of Virginia. At the 2012 ACRA Championships Michigan yet again failed to win the Varsity 8, despite having mostly senior oarsmen who had spent time in the eight since sophomore year. Yet in 2013 and 2014 the Varsity 8 placed first with Virginia placing second.

References

Year of birth missing (living people)
Living people
Grand Valley State Lakers rowers
Grand Valley State Lakers rowing coaches
Michigan Wolverines rowing coaches